Columbia Theological Seminary is a Presbyterian seminary in Decatur, Georgia.  It is one of ten theological institutions affiliated with the Presbyterian Church (USA).

History
Columbia Theological Seminary was founded in 1828 in Lexington, Georgia, by several Presbyterian ministers. In 1830, the seminary was moved to Columbia, South Carolina (taking its name at that location), and in 1927, to its current location in suburban Atlanta. During the American Civil War, the seminary became affiliated with the Presbyterian Church of the Confederate States of America, renamed the Presbyterian Church in the United States after the war. The school became a battle ground in the debate over the theory of evolution in the PCUS during the 1880s, due to the controversial views of James Woodrow, an uncle of President Woodrow Wilson and seminary science professor, who aligned with evolution, a controversy which led to the school not operating during the 1887-1888 academic year.

In 1830, Columbia, South Carolina, became the first permanent location of the seminary. The school became popularly known as Columbia Theological Seminary, and the name was formally accepted in 1925. The decade of the 1920s saw a shift in population throughout the Southeast. Atlanta was becoming a commercial and industrial center and growing rapidly in its cultural and educational opportunities. Between 1925 and 1930, President Richard T. Gillespie provided leadership that led to the development of the present facilities on a fifty-seven-acre tract in Decatur, Georgia. Because the early years in Decatur were difficult, the future of the institution became uncertain. Columbia, however, experienced substantial growth under the leadership of Dr. J. McDowell Richards, who was elected president in 1932 and led the seminary for almost four decades.

Columbia was one of the several PCUS seminaries that joined the PC (U.S.A.) following the 1983 PCUS and United Presbyterian Church in the U.S.A. merger. It upholds its historic covenants with the Synods of Living Waters and South Atlantic.

Presidents
1911–1921 Rev. Dr. Thornton Whaling
1921–1924 Rev. Dr. John M. Wells
1925–1930 Rev. Dr. Richard T. Gillespie
1932–1971 Rev. Dr. J. McDowell Richards 
1971–1976 Dr. C. Benton Kline 
1976–1987 Rev. Dr. J. Davison Philips 
1987–2000 Rev. Dr. Douglas Oldenburg 
2000–2009 Rev. Dr. Laura S. Mendenhall 
2009–2014 Rev. Dr. Stephen A. Hayner
2015–2022 Rev. Dr. Leanne Van Dyk 
 2022–present Rev. Dr. Victor Aloyo

Notable people

Frederick Buechner 
Columbia’s affiliation with the acclaimed American theologian and writer, Frederick Buechner, is centered on the Presbyterian values shared between school and author. In the interest of promoting these shared values, the Seminary has regularly distributed copies of Buechner’s works among its students. Columbia Theological Seminary also awards student prizes for Excellence in Preaching and Excellence in Writing named in honor of the author. Winners of the prize are selected by faculty in recognition of their significant achievements in these areas. Additionally, Buechner enjoys a long-lasting friendship with Walter Brueggemann, Old Testament Professor Emeritus at the Seminary. Both men were contemporaries at Union Theological Seminary.

Reverend Dr. Thomas Goulding 
One of the founding presbyterian ministers and the first president of the early Presbyterian Theological Seminary in 1830,  Thomas Goulding was born in Midway, Liberty county. Ga., March
14, 1786. He was ordained January 1, 1816 and served as its minister for 6 years before resigning his charge, where he helped to build the community that later would become the Seminary and was elected by the synod of Georgia and South Carolina to be its first, and at the time, only professor. Dr. Goulding, by appointment of the General Assembly, opened the first session of the Synod of Georgia, which met in Macon on the 20th of November, 1845, with a sermon from Acts xx: 28, and was elected its first Moderator.

References

History of Columbia Theological Seminary by George T. Howe; Presbyterian Publishing House, Columbia, SC; 1884.
Columbia Theological Seminary and The Southern Presbyterian Church by William Childs Robinson, AM, ThD, DD; Dennis Lindsey Printing Co., Inc., Decatur, GA; 1931.
Colored Light by Louis C. LaMotte, MA, ThM; Presbyterian Committee of Publication, Richmond, VA; 1937.
As I Remember It by Dr. J. McDowell Richards; Columbia Theological Seminary Press, Decatur, GA; 1985.
Time of Blessing, Time of Hope by J. Davison Philips; Columbia Theological Seminary Press, Decatur, GA; 1994.
To Count Our Days: A History of Columbia Theological Seminary by Erskine Clarke; University of South Carolina Press, Columbia, SC; 2019.

External links
 Official website

Presbyterian Church (USA) seminaries
Educational institutions established in 1828
Presbyterianism in Georgia (U.S. state)
Seminaries and theological colleges in Georgia (U.S. state)
Universities and colleges accredited by the Southern Association of Colleges and Schools
Universities and colleges in DeKalb County, Georgia
Decatur, Georgia
Presbyterian Church in the United States
1828 establishments in Georgia (U.S. state)